R. A. Ghani (1927 – 15 January 2016; Sadullapur, Gaibandha) was a Bangladeshi engineer and Bangladesh Nationalist Party politician.  He was a member of the Jatiya Sangsad, and served as the state minister of Science and Technology.

Biography
Ghani was born in 1927 at Bosniapara in Sadullapur of Gaibandha. He passed his matriculation exams from Gaibandha Boys' School ranked 13th in the combined merit list. He passed his intermediate exams from Presidency College in Calcutta. He completed graduation from Ahsanullah Engineering College (now BUET) in civil engineering in 1952. During this time Ghani took part in the Language Movement.

In 1953 Ghani founded Brixton & Brixton Ltd (now GBL - Ganibangla Ltd), which describes itself as the oldest consulting engineering firm in Bangladesh.

He completed an MS from University of California, Berkeley in 1963, and completed a DSc degree from Washington University in St. Louis.

He took part in the 1969 Mass uprising in East Pakistan and the Liberation War of Bangladesh.

Ghani was elected as a member of the Jatiya Sangsad from Rangpur-19 in 1979. He was appointed State Minister of Science and Technology during the reign of Ziaur Rahman. He was a member of the standing committee of the Bangladesh Nationalist Party.

He founded R A Gani School & College, Gaibandha.

He was married to Mrs. Hosne Ara Ghani. They had three daughters and a son.

Ghani passed away on 15 January 2016 at Square Hospital in Dhaka. He was 89.

References

1927 births
2016 deaths
People from Gaibandha District
Bangladeshi engineers
2nd Jatiya Sangsad members
Bangladesh Nationalist Party politicians
Bangladesh University of Engineering and Technology alumni
State Ministers of Science and Technology (Bangladesh)
Bengali language movement activists
People of the Bangladesh Liberation War